The Diploma of the Joannites, or Diploma of the Knights of St. John, was a grant issued in 1247 by King Béla IV of Hungary, to Master Rembald of the Knights Hospitaller. It allowed the Knights to settle in Severin, in what is today Romania, where they could defend the Hungarian borders against Cuman invaders.

See also
 Litovoi
 Seneslau
 John
 Farcaș

External links
Latin text of the Diploma

Knights Hospitaller
13th century in Hungary
Medieval charters and cartularies of Hungary